Alcantarea brasiliana is a species in the genus Alcantarea. This species is endemic to Brazil.

References

brasiliana
Flora of Brazil